Oslo Freedom Forum (OFF) is a series of global conferences run by the New York-based non-profit Human Rights Foundation under the slogan "Challenging Power". OFF was founded in 2009 as a one-time event and has taken place annually ever since. One of the key objectives of the conferences is to bring together notable people, including former heads of state, winners of the Nobel Peace Prize, prisoners of conscience, as well as of other public figures in order to network and exchange ideas about human rights and exposing dictatorships.

The main OFF conference is held annually in central Oslo, Norway, while satellite events have been held in San Francisco and New York, and on college campuses in the United States. OFF talks are live-streamed and consist of lectures and panel discussions taking place in front of a live audience.

OFF was founded by human rights activist Thor Halvorssen.

Events
2009
The inaugural Oslo Freedom Forum, titled "The Nobility of the Human Spirit and the Power of Freedom", featured more than 30 speakers with an emphasis on the importance of literature in advancing the cause of freedom. Participants included Nobel Laureate Elie Wiesel; Czech playwright and politician Václav Havel; Kurdish rights advocate Leyla Zana; and Tibetan former political prisoner Palden Gyatso.

Norwegian daily Klassekampen called the conference an "impressive assembly of people." The Wall Street Journal described OFF as "unlike any other human-rights conference... the emphasis was on promoting basic rights in all nations at all times."

2010
The 2010 Oslo Freedom Forum, organized around the theme "From Tragedy to Triumph", featured participants from more than 40 countries and six continents. The event focused on the progress made in the realms of civil liberties and freedoms over the past century, while highlighting the innovation of modern-day advocates—activists, policy makers, world leaders, and media entrepreneurs.

The Economist described the 2010 forum as "A spectacular human-rights festival… on its way to becoming a human right equivalent of the Davos economic forum."

2011
The 2011 Oslo Freedom Forum took place under the theme "Spark of Change", and featured speakers from across the world who gave presentations on an array of topics, from an analysis of some of the world's most prominent dictatorships, to a look at the impact that a single individual can have on the world.

The Economist described the 2011 OFF as "a glittering gathering of veterans of human-rights struggles." Peter Thiel (of Facebook, PayPal, and LinkedIn) praised the Oslo Freedom Forum "because [its] focus on dissidents engages the intellectual debate as well as the moral cause."

2012
Titled "Out of Darkness, Into Light", the fourth annual Oslo Freedom Forum explored numerous topics, including a spotlight on the many forms of modern-day slavery; exposés on how Western public relations agencies, IT firms, and arms companies support dictatorships; the drug war's impact on human rights; a focus on the burgeoning democracy movement in Russia; perspectives on fighting poverty through individual rights; an examination of global censorship; and a discussion on the state of the Arab uprisings. Supporters included the City of Oslo, the Norwegian Ministry of Foreign Affairs, Amnesty International, the Thiel Foundation, Fritt Ord, the Nobel Peace Center, and the Norwegian Helsinki Committee.

The Daily Beast described the forum as a conference of "do-gooders conspiring to stir up trouble," while The Guardian called it "a Davos for Revolutionaries."

2013
The 2013 Oslo Freedom Forum was themed "Challenging Power" and centered on a range of topics, such as the art of dissent, asymmetric activism, new tools for rights advocates, the power of media, women under Islamic law, and the threat of authoritarian regimes with façade capitalism.

2013 speakers included Chinese dissident Chen Guangcheng; recently escaped blogger Bahraini Ali Abdulemam; Peruvian Nobel laureate Mario Vargas Llosa; Zimbabwean artist Owen Maseko; Tibetan prime minister Lobsang Sangay; creator of the Magnitsky Act Bill Browder; Palestinian journalist Asmaa al-Ghoul; Malaysian lawyer and democracy advocate Ambiga Sreenevasan; and Serbian nonviolent resistance leader Srđa Popović.

The conference culminated with the presentation of the Václav Havel International Prize for Creative Dissent. The 2013 laureates were Syrian cartoonist Ali Ferzat, North Korean democracy activist Park Sang Hak, and Cuban civil society group Ladies in White—represented by their leader Berta Soler.

The conference was chronicled in VICE, BuzzFeed, El País, El Mundo, Aftenposten, and Verdens Gang. Speakers were profiled in The Atlantic, CNN, The Economist, The New York Times, CNET, The Wall Street Journal, NPR, Dagens Næringsliv, and Finansavisen. BuzzFeed described the conference as "an internationalist networking party where dissidents trade tips on overthrowing authoritarian regimes," while Al Jazeera characterized it as "an annual conference that gives the people who challenge repressive regimes a platform to speak."

The forum ended with the presentation of the second Václav Havel Prize for Creative Dissent to Ali Ferzat, a Syrian political cartoonist, the Ladies in White (from Cuba) and Park Sang Hak, a North Korean democracy advocate.

2014
The 2014 Oslo Freedom Forum included Egyptian satirist Bassem Youssef; Harvard cognitive scientist Steven Pinker; Cuban blogger Yoani Sánchez; American actor Jeffrey Wright; Ukrainian pro-democracy activist Yulia Marushevska; iconic Turkish protestor Erdem Gündüz, as well as Marcela Turati Muñoz, Yeonmi Park, Hyeonseo Lee, Iyad El-Baghdadi, Ti-Anna Wang, Suleiman Bakhit, Jamila Raqib, Nadezhda Tolokonnikova, Maria Aljokhina and Mikhail Khodorkovskij.

The New York Times called the Oslo Freedom Forum the place where "the world’s dissidents have their say."

2015 
The 2015 Oslo Freedom Forum took place on 25–27 May and was described by The Financial Times as a "Davos for dissidents." Speakers included Charlie Hebdo columnist Zineb El Rhazoui, North Korean Ji Seong-ho, Afghan entrepreneur Saad Mohseni, and Twitter vice president Colin Crowell.

2016
The 2016 Oslo Freedom Forum took place on 23–25 May 2016. Speakers included Afghan entrepreneur Roya Mahboob and Russian opposition activist Vladimir Kara-Murza.

2017
The 2017 Oslo Freedom Forum took place on 23–24 May 2017. Speakers included Norway's Prime Minister Erna Solberg, the Maldives' first democratically elected president, Mohamed Nasheed, Peter Thiel, and American Nobel Laureate and director of the International Campaign to Ban Landmines, Jody Williams. A second event took place on 19 September 2017, in New York City, parallel to the 72nd session of the United Nations General Assembly. The event took place at Alice Tully Hall, Lincoln Center, and was considered a "one-day" version of the event typically held in Oslo. Speakers included among others former World Chess Champion and chairman of the Human Rights Foundation Garry Kasparov, Iranian dissident Marina Nemat, Russian democracy activist Vladimir Kara-Murza, Serbian political activist Srđa Popović and Venezuelan democracy activist Wuilly Arteaga.

2018
The Oslo Freedom Forum took place from 28 to 30 May 2018. Speakers included Clare Rewcastle Brown, Lebo Mashile, Asma Khalifa, Galia Benartzi, Mu Sochua, Leyla Yunus, Tiff Stevenson, Antonio Ledezma, Netiwit Chotiphatphaisal, Fang Zheng, Wael Ghonim, Jason Silva, Rick Doblin, Maziar Bahari and Emmanuel Jal.

2019 
In 2019, The Oslo Freedom Forum held a one-day event in Taipei. Speakers included Denise Ho Thae Young-ho and Thai education reformer and activist Netiwit Chotiphatphaisal.

2020 
Due to the coronavirus pandemic in 2020, the forum was held online. Speakers included Park Eun-hee,

Participants

San Francisco Freedom Forum
Iconic Burmese pro-democracy leader Aung San Suu Kyi headlined the 2012 San Francisco event, which featured talks exploring various paths to freedom. Other speakers included: Saudi women's rights pioneer Manal al-Sharif; conflict psychologist Justine Hardy; Iranian author and former prisoner of conscience Marina Nemat; Slate editor and author William J. Dobson; drug policy reformer Ethan Nadelmann; Chinese scholar and former political prisoner Yang Jianli; Ghanaian economist George Ayittey; Moroccan journalist Ahmed Benchemsi; and Kazakhstani theater director Bolat Atabayev.

As part of her first trip to the United States after more than 20 years under house arrest in Burma, Suu Kyi accepted the 2012 Václav Havel International Prize for Creative Dissent.

The 2016 San Francisco Freedom Forum took place at the Regency Center in the last week of September and included Rosa Maria Paya; Zineb El Rhazoui, Danilo Maldonado Machado, Lee Hyeon-seo, Roya Mahboob, Yulia Marushevska, Abdalaziz Alhamza, and Kimberley Motley.

College Freedom Forum
The first College Freedom Forum took place at Tufts University on 5 November 2013. Speakers included Iranian author and former prisoner of conscience Marina Nemat; Moroccan journalist and media entrepreneur Ahmed Benchemsi; Equatoguinean human rights lawyer Tutu Alicante; president and CEO of Liberty in North Korea (LiNK) Hannah Song; and Egyptian journalist Abeer Allam.

The second College Freedom Forum took place at the University of Colorado Boulder on 11 March 2014. Speakers included Chinese civil rights activist Chen Guangcheng; Ugandan LGBT rights advocate Kasha Jacqueline; Bahraini human rights activist Maryam al-Khawaja; and North Korean defector and democracy advocate Park Sang Hak. Talks were followed by a moderated question and answer session with the audience. The event was a joint initiative of the Human Rights Foundation (HRF) and the University of Colorado Boulder Distinguished Speakers Board and Cultural Events Board.

The third College Freedom Forum took place at Yale University on 26 March 2015. Speakers included Iranian author and former prisoner of conscience Marina Nemat; North Korean defector Yeonmi Park; American journalist William Dobson; and Serbian expert on nonviolent resistance Srđa Popović. Talks were followed by a question and answer session with the audience. The event was a joint initiative of the Human Rights Foundation (HRF) and Yale ThiNK (There is Hope in North Korea).

References

External links
 

Human rights organisations based in Norway
International conferences in Norway
Annual events in Norway
Recurring events established in 2009
2009 establishments in Norway